William Edison Nichol (March 12, 1918 – November 29, 2006) was an American politician who served as the 33rd lieutenant governor of Nebraska from 1987 to 1991.

Nichol was born in Windsor, Colorado in 1918.  He went to high school in the Scottsbluff Public Schools system, graduating in 1935, and graduated from Nebraska Wesleyan University in 1940. He married his wife Ruth in 1941.

His political career began with local positions, as a county commissioner for Scotts Bluff County (1967–75), and as a city councilperson and mayor of Scottsbluff.  He was first elected to the Nebraska Legislature in 1974, replacing longtime representative Terry Carpenter.  He later served as speaker of the legislature.  In 1987, Nichol was elected lieutenant governor, and Kay A. Orr won as governor.  He decided not to seek reelection in 1991.

Nichol died in Scottsbluff on November 29, 2006.

References

1918 births
2006 deaths
County supervisors and commissioners in Nebraska
Lieutenant Governors of Nebraska
Mayors of places in Nebraska
Nebraska city council members
Republican Party Nebraska state senators
Speakers of the Nebraska Legislature
Nebraska Wesleyan University alumni
20th-century American politicians
People from Windsor, Colorado
People from Scottsbluff, Nebraska